Audemus jura nostra defendere — Latin for "We Dare Defend Our Rights" or "We Dare Maintain Our Rights" — is the state motto of Alabama and is depicted on the official Coat of arms of Alabama.  The current coat of arms was created in 1923 at the request of state historian and director of the Alabama Department of Archives and History, Marie Bankhead Owen.  It was not officially adopted until March 14, 1939.  The motto itself is emblazoned on a golden band across the bottom of the coat of arms.  The escutcheon of the coat of arms is quartered into the flags of the Kingdom of France, the Crown of Castile, the United Kingdom of Great Britain and Ireland, and the Confederate States of America, with a central overlay of the shield of the United States.  Bald eagles serve as supporters to either side of the escutcheon.  All is surmounted by a crimson and white torse and the Baldine, the sailing ship that Iberville and Bienville arrived in prior to the settlement of the colony of Mobile.

History

The modern Alabama motto was added to the current coat of arms when it was created in 1923.  It was officially adopted for use in 1939.  It is the second state motto.  The first motto was adopted by the Reconstruction Era state legislature on December 29, 1868, for use on the second Seal of Alabama.  It depicted a bald eagle atop an American shield, holding a banner inscribed with the motto "Here We Rest" in its beak.

The source of the current motto is drawn from the lines of "An Ode in Imitation of Alcaeus," also known by its first line, "What constitutes a State?" It was published in 1781 by the eighteenth-century liberal English philologist Sir William Jones. This poem advanced his ideas on government and morality and was considered by scholars as his greatest political poem.  In it he criticizes the widespread corruption of the day and misuse of monarchical power.  The words were adjusted by Marie Bankhead Owen into a motto, which was then translated into Latin by Professor W. B. Saffold, of the University of Alabama.

See also
List of Alabama state symbols

References

Symbols of Alabama
Latin mottos
State mottos of the United States